Fujioka may refer to:
Fujioka, Aichi, a former town located in Nishikamo District, Aichi, Japan
Fujioka, Gunma, a city in Gunma, Japan
Fujioka, Tochigi, a former town located in Shimotsuga District, Tochigi, Japan

People
Fujioka (surname)